The All-Military Classic was an annual two-day college basketball tournament hosted at rotating campus sites that featured four military academies – Air Force, Army, The Citadel, and VMI. The tournament was inaugurated in 2011, and was originally broadcast by CBS Sports Network for the semifinal games, though was most recently televised by ESPNU and ESPN3 in 2013. The fourth and final edition of the tournament was hosted and won by Army in 2014.

History 
The tournament began in 2011 and was hosted by the Air Force Academy at the Clune Arena in Colorado Springs, Colorado. The format was a simple four-team single elimination tournament with a third-place consolation game. Air Force won the inaugural tournament, and won the 2012 tournament which was hosted by The Citadel at the McAlister Field House as well. VMI, who played host in 2013, won the title on their home court by defeating Air Force 71–63 in the championship game, which was also the first time Air Force had ever lost in the tournament, going 5–0 in previous games.

The final installment of the tournament took place from November 14–15, 2014 at Army's Christl Arena in West Point, New York. The Black Knights first defeated Air Force and proceeded to win the title by beating VMI 92–86 in the championship game. It was the school's first AMC victory, and Kyle Wilson was named the tournament's Most Valuable Player with 44 total points in the two games. The host school of the tournament would end up winning the title three out of the four years it was played, with The Citadel's loss in 2012 being the only exception.

2011 
 Host: Air Force – Clune Arena, Colorado Springs, CO

 All-Tournament Team: Rodney Glasgow (VMI), Ella Ellis (Army), Todd Fletcher (Air Force), Mike Groselle (The Citadel), Keith Gabriel (VMI)
 Tournament MVP: Michael Lyons, Air Force

2012 
 Host: The Citadel – McAlister Field House, Charleston, SC

 All-Tournament Team: Stan Okoye (VMI), Ella Ellis (Army), Lawrence Miller (The Citadel), Mike Groselle (The Citadel), Michael Lyons (Air Force)
 Tournament MVP: Michael Lyons, Air Force

2013 
 Host: VMI – Cameron Hall, Lexington, VA

 All-Tournament Team: Rodney Glasgow (VMI), Kyle Wilson (Army), Brian White (The Citadel), QJ Peterson (VMI), Tre Coggins (Air Force)
 Tournament MVP: QJ Peterson, VMI

2014 
 Host: Army – Christl Arena, West Point, New York

 All-Tournament Team: Kyle Wilson (Army), Tanner Plomb (Army), QJ Peterson (VMI), Max Yon (Air Force), Ashton Moore (The Citadel)
 Tournament MVP: Kyle Wilson, Army

Final records

Standings history

References 

College men's basketball competitions in the United States
Recurring sporting events established in 2011
Recurring sporting events disestablished in 2014
Air Force Falcons men's basketball
Army Black Knights men's basketball
The Citadel Bulldogs basketball
VMI Keydets basketball
2011 establishments in the United States
2014 disestablishments in the United States